Regis Jesuit High School is a private, Catholic, college preparatory high school administered  by the Central and Southern Province of the Society of Jesus in Aurora, Colorado. It was founded by the Jesuits in 1877. The high school shares much of its history with Regis University in neighboring Denver, Colorado. The school is a member of the Jesuit Schools Network The school is located in the Archdiocese of Denver.

History

The school was founded by Italian Jesuits in 1877 in Las Vegas, New Mexico. Another school was opened in Morrison, Colorado, seven years later. In 1888, the two schools were merged and renamed for St. John Francis Regis to become Regis College, located on 52nd and Lowell Streets in Denver, Colorado. In 1921, the school was formally split into Regis High School and Regis College (now Regis University). The high school and University co-existed on the campus in Denver and shared facilities until a separate building was built on campus for the high school in 1984. In 1989, a parcel of land near Parker and Arapahoe Roads in Aurora was donated to the school. That area is now called the Campbell Campus, and it houses both the Girls and Boys Divisions. In 2016 Regis appointed David Card as president, the first layperson to hold that position.

Demographics

The demographic breakdown of the 1,654 students enrolled in 2015-2016 was:

Native American/Alaskan - 0.2%
Asian/Pacific islanders - 5.3
Black - 3.9%
Hispanic - 8.4%
White - 81.9%
Multiracial - 0.3%

Athletics
As of 2018, Regis Jesuit had won 67 State Championships, with 54 for boys since 1988. The girls by their 13th year of existence had won 12 championships (including Spirit in 2010). This places Regis 6th in the state in number of State Championships. In 2013 Sports Illustrated selected Regis as having the best high school athletics program in Colorado.

Notable alumni

Ty Blach, Major League Baseball pitcher for the San Francisco Giants
C. Michael Callihan (Class of 1965), 42nd Lt. Governor of Colorado. Previously Gunnison County Assessor, Colorado State Representative, Colorado State Senator
J.V. Cunningham, poet
Roger Espinoza (Class of 2005), Honduras national football team.
John Fante (Class of 1927), Italian-American novelist, short-story writer, and screenwriter
Zach Fenoglio (Class of 2007), hooker for the Glendale Raptors and USA Eagles and a starter in the 2015 Rugby World Cup; was also a chemistry teacher at Regis Jesuit High School.
Missy Franklin (Class of 2013), Olympic gold medal swimmer and world record holder.
Bill Garnett, former NBA player for the Dallas Mavericks and Indiana Pacers.
Tim Miller (political strategist) (Class of 2000)
Josh Perkins, professional basketball player for Hapoel Gilboa Galil of the Israeli Basketball Premier League.
David Peterson, first round pick in the 2017 MLB Draft by the New York Mets
Klint Kubiak (Class of 2005), offensive coordinator for the Minnesota Vikings.
John Matthews (Class of 2005), wide receiver, American professional football
Chris Hardwick, television host and comedian; previously the host of Singled Out and current host of The Nerdist Podcast, @midnight, The Talking Dead and The Wall on NBC.
Brian Mullan (Class of 1996), professional soccer player, one of four players to have won five or more MLS Cup titles.
Neil Hopkins (Class of 1995), television and film actor
John Carroll Lynch (Class of 1981), actor on The Drew Carey Show and more.
Jack Swigert, test pilot for NASA and astronaut with the Apollo 13 crew; elected to Congress for Colorado's 6th district, but died before being sworn in.

See also
 List of Jesuit sites
 Regis University

References

External links

Jesuit Secondary Education Association

Catholic secondary schools in Colorado
Educational institutions established in 1877
Education in Aurora, Colorado
Jesuit high schools in the United States
Schools in Arapahoe County, Colorado
Roman Catholic Archdiocese of Denver
1877 establishments in New Mexico Territory